Jaroslav Augusta (September 4, 1878 in Humpolec - February 28, 1970 in Banská Štiavnica) was a Czechoslovak painter, based in modern-day Slovakia.

Background

From 1897-1901 he studied with Professor M. Pirner at the Academy in Prague and later (1901–1904) at the Academy in Munich with J. Hertericha and K. Marr. His artistic education was completed at a private studio. In 1901, he founded an art colony at Detva, and in 1903 was among the founders of the Group of Hungarian-Slovak artists.

He was heavily influenced by European and Slovak open-air landscape painting. He also excelled as an author with a social theme and genre paintings, often including ethnographic elements. Whilst at Važec he painted many watercolors which are a permanent reminder of this village. In 1920 he settled permanently in Banská Štiavnica, where he became professor of drawing.

His paintings are represented in the Augusta galleries, the Slovak Republic, the Czech Republic, such as the Moravian Gallery in Brno and abroad, and his work is sought after in art auctions. In 1960 he published his autobiography.

He died in Banská Štiavnica on 18 February 1970 at the age of 92 years.

References

1878 births
1970 deaths
People from Humpolec
People from Banská Štiavnica
Academy of Fine Arts, Prague alumni
Czechoslovak painters